Robert Berger (born 7 November 1996) is a professional footballer who plays as a right back for Chemnitzer FC in the Regionalliga Nordost. Born in Germany, he has represented both Germany and Kazakhstan at youth level.

Club career 

Berger is a youth exponent from Energie Cottbus. He made his 2. Bundesliga debut at 11 May 2014 against FC Ingolstadt 04. He replaced Erik Jendrišek after 70 minutes in a 2–0 away defeat.

References 

1996 births
Living people
German footballers
German people of Kazakhstani descent
Kazakhstani people of German descent
Association football defenders
2. Bundesliga players
3. Liga players
Regionalliga players
FC Energie Cottbus players
FSV Zwickau players
1. FC Lokomotive Leipzig players
Chemnitzer FC players
Germany youth international footballers
Kazakhstan under-21 international footballers
People from Bad Muskau
Footballers from Saxony